Jozef Roháček (6 February 1877 – 28 July 1962) was a Slovak Protestant activist, evangelist and scholar.

He translated the Bible from original languages into Slovak. The first edition of the complete Lutheran Slovak Bible was edited by British and Foreign Bible Society in 1936. The revised edition was printed in Kutná Hora (Czech Republic) in 1951.

Publications
Evolucionizmus vo svetle pravdy alebo čo má každý vzdelaný človek vedieť o evolucionizme (Evolutionism in the light of truth or what should every literate person know about evolutionism), Bratislava, Svetlo, 1936

References

1877 births
1962 deaths
20th-century Christian biblical scholars
Czechoslovak activists
Czechoslovak religious leaders
European biblical scholars
Lutheran biblical scholars
People from Stará Turá
Slovak activists
Slovak evangelists
Slovak Lutherans
Slovak Christian clergy
20th-century Lutheran clergy
Translators of the Bible into Slovak
20th-century translators